Morpheeins are proteins that can form two or more different homo-oligomers (morpheein forms), but must come apart and change shape to convert between forms.  The alternate shape may reassemble to a different oligomer.  The shape of the subunit dictates which oligomer is formed.  Each oligomer has a finite number of subunits (stoichiometry).  Morpheeins can interconvert between forms under physiological conditions and can exist as an equilibrium of different oligomers.  These oligomers are physiologically relevant and are not misfolded protein; this distinguishes morpheeins from prions and amyloid.  The different oligomers have distinct functionality.  Interconversion of morpheein forms can be a structural basis for allosteric regulation, an idea noted many years ago, and later revived.  A mutation that shifts the normal equilibrium of morpheein forms can serve as the basis for a conformational disease.  Features of morpheeins can be exploited for drug discovery. The dice image (Fig 1) represents a morpheein equilibrium containing two different monomeric shapes that dictate assembly to a tetramer or a pentamer.  The one protein that is established to function as a morpheein is porphobilinogen synthase, though there are suggestions throughout the literature that other proteins may function as morpheeins (for more information see "Table of Putative Morpheeins" below).

Implications for drug discovery 

Conformational differences between subunits of different oligomers and related functional differences of a morpheein provide a starting point for drug discovery.  Protein function is dependent on the oligomeric form; therefore, the protein's function can be regulated by shifting the equilibrium of forms.  A small molecule compound can shift the equilibrium either by blocking or favoring formation of one of the oligomers.  The equilibrium can be shifted using a small molecule that has a preferential binding affinity for only one of the alternate morpheein forms.  An inhibitor of porphobilinogen synthase with this mechanism of action has been documented.

Implications for allosteric regulation 

The morpheein model of allosteric regulation has similarities to and differences from other models.  The concerted model (the Monod, Wyman and Changeux (MWC) model) of allosteric regulation requires all subunits to be in the same conformation or state within an oligomer like the morpheein model. However, neither this model nor the sequential model (Koshland, Nemethy, and Filmer model) takes into account that the protein may dissociate to interconvert between oligomers. Nonetheless, shortly after these theories were described, two groups of workers proposed what is now called the morpheein model and showed that it accounted for the regulatory behavior of glutamate dehydrogenase. Kurganov and Friedrich discussed models of this kind extensively in their books.

Implications for teaching about protein structure-function relationships 

It is generally taught  that a given amino acid sequence will have only one physiologically relevant (native) quaternary structure; morpheeins challenge this concept.  The morpheein model does not require gross changes in the basic protein fold.  The conformational differences that accompany conversion between oligomers may be similar to the protein motions necessary for function of some proteins.  The morpheein model highlights the importance of conformational flexibility for protein functionality and offers a potential explanation for proteins showing non-Michaelis-Menten kinetics, hysteresis, and/or protein concentration dependent specific activity.

Implications for understanding the structural basis for disease 

The term "conformational disease" generally encompasses mutations that result in misfolded proteins that aggregate, such as Alzheimer's and Creutzfeldt–Jakob diseases.  In light of the discovery of morpheeins, however, this definition could be expanded to include mutations that shift an equilibrium of alternate oligomeric forms of a protein.  An example of such a conformational disease is ALAD porphyria, which results from a mutation of porphobilinogen synthase that causes a shift in its morpheein equilibrium.

Table of proteins whose published behavior is consistent with that of a morpheein

References 

Proteins